Julio César Enciso Ferreira (born 5 August 1974 in Capiatá) is a Paraguayan association footballer who made 70 appearances for the Paraguay national team between 1995 and 2004.

Club career
Enciso started his playing career in 1994 with Cerro Porteño where he won the league championships in his debut season. In 1996, he was signed by Internacional of Brazil where he played for 5 seasons, winning the Campeonato Gaúcho in 1997.

Enciso returned to Paraguay in 2001 to play for Olimpia Asunción where he won the Copa Libertadores 2002 and the Recopa Sudamericana 2003. He left the club in 2005

His last club was 12 de Octubre where he spent the 2006 season and announced his retirement. However, for the 2008 Clausura tournament he was called by the coach, Saturnino Arrua, and decided to make a comeback to help the team get out of the relegation zone.

International career
Enciso played for Paraguay at the 1998 World Cup. He missed out on his country's 2002 campaign. That same year he won the Copa Libertadores as a captain with Olimpia. Afterwards he was named an over-age player for the 2004 Olympics, where he helped Paraguay to a silver medal.

He also played for Paraguay in three editions of the Copa América in 1995, 1999 and 2001.

Honours

Club
 Cerro Porteño
 Paraguayan Primera División: 1994
 Internacional
 Campeonato Gaúcho: 1997
 Olimpia
 Copa Libertadores: 2002
 Recopa Sudamericana: 2003

National team
 Paraguay
 Summer Olympics: 2004 (Silver medal)

References

External links
International statistics at rsssf

1974 births
Living people
People from Capiatá
Paraguayan footballers
Sport Club Internacional players
Cerro Porteño players
Club Olimpia footballers
Paraguay international footballers
1995 Copa América players
1998 FIFA World Cup players
1999 Copa América players
2001 Copa América players
Copa Libertadores-winning players
Olympic footballers of Paraguay
Footballers at the 2004 Summer Olympics
Olympic silver medalists for Paraguay
Paraguayan expatriate footballers
Expatriate footballers in Brazil
Olympic medalists in football
Medalists at the 2004 Summer Olympics
Association football midfielders